Achatinella pupukanioe is a species of land snail, a gastropod in the family Achatinellidae. It is endemic to Hawaii.

Shell description
The dextral shell is conic and solid. The shell has six whorls. The glossy color is a uniform white, or ivory yellow with a white sutural line or either of these tints with a burnt sienna band immediately above a wider and darker band. The suture is margined. The lip is not expanded and has a brownish edge; the internal rib is white, or sometimes the whole lip is pale-pink. The white columellar fold is rather strong and abrupt.

The height of the shell is 16.3 mm. The width of the shell is 9.7 mm.

References
This article incorporates public domain text (a public domain work of the United States Government) from reference.

pupukanioe
Molluscs of Hawaii
Endemic fauna of Hawaii
Biota of Hawaii (island)
Biota of Kauai
Biota of Maui
Biota of Oahu
Critically endangered fauna of the United States
Gastropods described in 1914
Taxonomy articles created by Polbot
ESA endangered species